IOE Chitwan Engineering Campus is one of the five constituent college of Institute of Engineering, Tribhuvan University. It is situated in Rampur, Chitwan. It was established in 2076 B.S.

Departments
 Department of Architecture

Courses
The courses offered by Chitwan Engineering Campus are:

Bachelor's Level
Architecture, B.Arch

References

Tribhuvan University